University Of Serang Raya, abbreviated UNSERA, is a private university in the area of Banten province and is a merger of two colleges namely STMIK Serang and STIE Serang that are in the shade of the Informatics Education Foundation.

Campus building 

A campus 
The STMIK is residing in the University of Serang Raya oldest campus buildings. The campus halls of the University of Serang Raya Central Library Building and Rector University of Serang Raya, which house the College of Engineering have also become a place of initial formation of the university.

B campus 
The campus is opposite the Headquarters and also adjacent to the Technology. Three faculties occupy the campus, namely Economics, Social and Political Sciences, and Science Communication. There are football and a basketball courts in this area of the campus.

Faculty 
 Information Management School
 Information Engineering
 Information Systems
 Computer Systems
 College of Engineering
 Civil Engineering
 Industrial Engineering
 Chemical Engineering
 Economics
 Accounting
 Management
 Social and Political Sciences
 Communication Studies
 State Administration

Diploma program 
 Accounting
 Marketing
 Finances
 Accounting
 Management

Honor Roll 
 

Universities in Indonesia
Universities in Banten
Serang